Pickwick Lake is the reservoir created by Pickwick Landing Dam as part of the Tennessee Valley Authority. The lake stretches from Pickwick Landing Dam to Wilson Dam. It is one of the few lakes in the United States to be located in 3 different states.

Pickwick Lake has excellent sportfishing areas, including the Wilson Dam tailwater at the upper end of the reservoir, noted for record-size smallmouth bass and catfish. Another favorite spot is the discharge basin at Colbert Fossil Plant west of Sheffield, Alabama, where the warm water discharged from the power plant attracts fish during cold weather.  The lakeshore plays host to two state parks:  Tennessee's Pickwick Landing State Park and Mississippi's J P Coleman State Park.

Pickwick Lake is the north end of the Tennessee-Tombigbee Waterway, which provides a water transportation route to the Gulf of Mexico.

Yellow Creek Cove is home to the Yellow Creek waterfall and is a popular destination for boaters. A rope swing off the top of the waterfall has been present for many years.

See also
Dams and reservoirs of the Tennessee River

References

External links
Tennessee Valley Authority: Pickwick Reservoir
Fishing Pickwick Lake Smallmouth Bass, Largemouth Bass, Crappie, and Sauger

Further reading
Grimsley, Rheta, "Dirty Little Story," Southern Spaces, 6 September 2012.

Bodies of water of Colbert County, Alabama
Florence–Muscle Shoals metropolitan area
Bodies of water of Hardin County, Tennessee
Bodies of water of Lauderdale County, Alabama
Reservoirs in Alabama
Reservoirs in Mississippi
Reservoirs in Tennessee
Tennessee River
Tennessee Valley Authority
Protected areas of Tishomingo County, Mississippi